Cromford Mill is the world's first water-powered cotton spinning mill, developed by Richard Arkwright in 1771 in Cromford, Derbyshire, England. The mill structure is classified as a Grade I listed building.  It is now the centrepiece of the Derwent Valley Mills UNESCO World Heritage Site, and is a multi-use visitor centre with shops, galleries, restaurants and cafes.

History
Following the invention of the flying shuttle for weaving cotton in 1733, the demand for spun cotton increased enormously in England. Machines for carding and spinning had already been developed but were inefficient. Spun cotton was also produced by means of the spinning jenny but was insufficiently strong to form the warp of a fabric, for which it was the practice to use linen thread, producing a type of cloth known as fustian. In 1769, Richard Arkwright patented a water frame  to use the extra power of a water mill after he had set up a horse-powered mill in Nottingham.

He chose the site at Cromford because it had year-round supply of warm water from the Cromford Sough which drained water from nearby Wirksworth lead mines, together with Bonsall Brook. Here he built a five-storey mill, with the backing of Jedediah Strutt (whom he met in a Nottingham bank via Ichabod Wright), Samuel Need and John Smalley. Starting from 1772, he ran the mills day and night with two twelve-hour shifts.

He started with 200 workers, more than the locality could provide, so he built housing for them nearby, one of the first manufacturers to do so. Most of the employees were women and children, the youngest being only seven years old. Later, the minimum age was raised to ten and the children were given six hours of education a week, so that they could do the record-keeping that their illiterate parents could not.

A large part of the village was built to house the mill workers. Stuart Fisher states that these are now considered to be "the first factory housing development in the world". Employees were provided with shops, pubs, chapels and a school.

The gate to Cromford Mill was shut at precisely 6 am and 6 pm every day, and any worker who failed to get through it not only lost a day's pay but also was fined another day's pay.

Cromford dollars 

In 1801 and 1802, during a national shortage of silver, Spanish real coins were overstamped for use as coinage at Cromford.

Closure and further use

The cotton mill ceased operation in the 19th century and the buildings were used for other purposes, finally a dyeing plant. In 1979, the Grade I listed site was bought by the Arkwright Society, who began the long task of restoring it to its original state.

The importance of this site is not that it was the first but that it was the first successful cotton spinning factory. It showed unequivocally the way ahead and was widely emulated.

World Heritage site
The Cromford mill complex, owned and being restored by the Arkwright Society, was declared by Historic England as "one of the country’s 100 irreplaceable sites". In 2018, the "Cromford Mills Creative Cluster and World Heritage Site Gateway Project" was listed as a finalist for the "Best Major Regeneration of a Historic Building or Place" in the Historic England Angel Awards.

In 2019, the Arkwright Society employed 100 people; by that time, the restoration expenditure had reached £48 million.

The mill and other buildings are open to the public every day, and has attracted visitors from all over the world. Facilities include a visitors' centre, shops and a café.

The nearby Cromford Canal towpath to High Peak Junction, and onwards towards Ambergate, is listed as a Biological Site of Special Scientific Interest (SSSI).

Restoration

Condition in 1995 
The 1771 building had been reduced by two storeys in 1929. Access was forbidden due to the toxic residue from the 20th-century paintmaking usage; the later tank with its toxic sediment obscured the foundations of the 1775 mill and the breast-shot waterwheel chamber. Only one remaining mill building was usable and suitable for guided tours.

Restoration in progress 2009

Restoration of hydropower capacity 
Installation of a water wheel, accompanied by a modern 20 kW hydro-turbine to power the buildings, was approved in 2022.

Buildings and structures

1771 mill

1775 mill

Waterworks
 Originally the sough drained into the brook back in the village, and both powered the original mill. The sough was separated and brought along a channel on the south side of Mill Road to the aqueduct. Both then supplied the second mill. In 1785 the mill was extended to its present length with a culvert beneath for the Bonsall Brook. The sough was separated from the brook and brought from the village along the south side of Mill Lane which it crossed by way of the aqueduct to a new overshot wheel. A complicated set of channels and sluices controlled the supply to the mill, or, on Sundays to the canal, with the surplus draining into the river.

Arkwright's use of the Bonsall Brook and Cromford Sough for his mills had been opposed by other local water users in a number of legal cases. In 1772, however, a new sough, Meerbrook Sough, had been started nearby, some 30m lower than Cromford Sough.  By 1813 the new sough was affecting the water volumes in Cromford Sough, leading Arkwright's son (also Richard Arkwright) and the other users to negotiate with the Meerbrook proprietors to place stop boards so as to keep Cromford water levels up.  Further legal cases followed, but by 1836 the stop boards had decayed and the negotiated leases had expired, so Cromford Sough was again reduced in flow.  Finally Arkwright sued for his water in a landmark legal suit, but the case was lost, and soon after 1847 the Cromford Mills were obliged to cease cotton manufacturing, being turned over to other uses.

Housing
The mill manager had a house on site. Although the first workers were brought in from outside the area, workers' housing was later built in Cromford.

Cromford Canal and wharf
The opening of the Cromford Canal and the associated Cromford Wharf in 1793 linked Arkwright's Mill to the major Midland and northern cities, although use of the canal was to decline as traffic moved onto the railways.

Machinery

Water frame
Initially the first stage of the process was hand carding, but in 1775 he took out a second patent for a water-powered carding machine and this led to increased output and the fame of his factory rapidly spread.  He was soon building further mills on this site and others and eventually employed 1,000 workers at Cromford. Many other mills were built under licence, including mills in Lancashire, Scotland and Germany. Samuel Slater, an apprentice of Jedediah Strutt, took the secrets of Arkwright's machines to Pawtucket, Rhode Island, USA, where he founded a cotton industry. Arkwright's success led to his patents being challenged in court and his second patent was overturned as having no originality. Nonetheless, by the time of his death in 1792 he was the wealthiest untitled person in Britain.

Cromford Mill has commissioned a replica water frame which was installed in April 2013. Considerable problems occurred in obtaining suitable roving, which had to be a low-twist 0.8 count cotton: there are no companies spinning cotton today in the United Kingdom. Roving was supplied eventually by Rieter in Switzerland, who had some experimental stock. Rieter are the world's largest manufacturer of textile manufacturing machines.

See also
Grade I listed buildings in Derbyshire
Listed buildings in Cromford
Kirk Mill
Masson Mill
New Lanark

References
Notes

Bibliography

External links

Arkwright Society - Cromford Mill - with tour information
 Cromford village website

Museums in Derbyshire
Textile mills in Derbyshire
Cotton mills
Industry museums in England
Textile museums in the United Kingdom
Watermills in Derbyshire
Brick buildings and structures
Former textile mills in the United Kingdom
History of the textile industry
Industrial Revolution in England
Spinning
Industrial buildings completed in 1772
Textile mills completed in the 18th century
Grade I listed buildings in Derbyshire
Grade I listed industrial buildings
Tourist attractions in Derbyshire
World Heritage Sites in England